Steelman is a hamlet in Saskatchewan.

Browning No. 34, Saskatchewan
Unincorporated communities in Saskatchewan
Division No. 1, Saskatchewan